Anthony Ryan Leslie (born September 25, 1978) is an American singer, songwriter, record producer, and entrepreneur from Washington, D.C. He has produced singles for a number of prominent artists in a variety of genres, ranging from R&B, hip hop, pop and gospel. Artists Leslie has worked with include Britney Spears, Beyoncé, Puff Daddy, LL Cool J, Kid Cudi, Kanye West, Usher, Mary J. Blige, Chris Brown, and Fabolous.

From 2005 to 2006, he has his prime commercial success to date with Cassie, whom signed to Leslie's NextSelection label imprint in a joint venture with Bad Boy Records. Leslie wrote and produced her debut Platinum-certified hit single, "Me & U" along with the entirety of her eponymous debut album (2006). Leslie's 2008 self-titled debut album, was a moderate success that included the singles "Diamond Girl", "Addiction" (featuring Fabolous and Cassie) and "How It Was Supposed to Be".

Leslie, who is a Harvard University graduate, is also the founder and CEO of SuperPhone and NextSelection Lifestyle Group. SuperPhone, a direct text marketing service, has been used by Miley Cyrus, Zayn, Joyner Lucas, Silk Sonic, and others. Leslie has been nominated for Grammy Awards, BET Awards, and Soul Train Music Awards.

Early life 
His parents are Salvation Army officers, who frequently relocate for work. Ryan's family are avid practicing Christians. Ryan has lived in various states, cities, and countries. At an early age, Leslie taught himself how to play the piano. He developed the ability to recite music, as well as arrange chords to create songs. At the age of 14, Leslie scored a 1600 on his SATs—a perfect score—while attending Bear Creek High School, in Stockton, California. In 1993, he applied to four University of California campuses as well as Stanford, Yale and Harvard. In his application essays he explained his interest in matriculating from his junior year in high school without having earned a diploma. He was accepted to all except for Stanford. He ultimately decided to attend Harvard College.  At the age of 19, Leslie graduated from Harvard with a degree in government, concentrating in political science and macroeconomics. During the undergraduate Class Day ceremonies, Leslie was selected to be the Harvard Male Orator, one of four seniors who deliver orations to the graduating senior class.

Leslie grew up around music, playing cornet as a child in the Salvation Army band. Ryan later switched to piano because his overbite made it difficult to get proper embouchure on a brass instrument. At Harvard, he joined the Krokodiloes, an a cappella group. Leslie suddenly saw a new future for himself when a friend played him a Stevie Wonder CD freshman year. "I became obsessed with him," says Leslie.  "I wanted to chase that man's career." Leslie became a constant presence at the on-campus recording studio. Fellow student Chiqui Matthew, now working for Goldman Sachs, remembered Leslie making beats at every free moment: "He was on a different level of intensity. Most of us were pretty realistic — we're Harvard students; this music stuff is fun, but this isn't the future. But Ryan always had a ten-year plan about how he was going to take over the music industry." While still a college student, Leslie began producing tracks for local Boston artists, and molding his image, which Matthew found unconvincing: "He had this pseudo-sexual, thugged-out Lothario thing. I never really bought it. He seemed more like a music nerd to me".

Music career

1997–2003: Career beginnings 
During his freshman year at Harvard, Leslie devoted many hours per week to creating and developing music in a studio basement on campus. He taught himself basic production skills and also developed a musical style of his own. As the semesters progressed, Leslie spent more and more time in the school's studio molding his craft. He also performed many events around campus and was a part of the school's all male a cappella group The Krokodiloes. Due to the conflict with music and school, Leslie was put on academic probation three times during his college career. He has said in many interviews that during those college years, he became accustomed to getting 2 to 3 hours of sleep per night. To earn disposable income during these years, Leslie sold instrumentals to local artists in the Boston area.

After graduating college, Leslie urged his parents to allow him to go into the music industry. They told him that he could have a better future considering he graduated from college at the age of 19. Leslie insisted that he was going to pursue his musical interests for two years and if he didn't like it he would stop. Leslie remained in Boston because of its music scene. He took on community service jobs to help support himself and would spend nights in the recording studio working on his music. Eventually, Leslie moved back home with his parents in Phoenix where he convinced them to take out a loan for a production studio so that he could pursue music full-time. He vowed to his family that he would pay back the $15,000 loan one day, even if it meant going back to school and getting a more traditional job. For the next several months, Leslie worked towards developing a distinct sound. During this period, Leslie has said that he ate and slept very little. In the summer of 2003, Ryan landed a production internship with producer Younglord. He has said in interviews that he considers this 30-day internship the jump-start of his career in the music industry.  Within the first week, Leslie produced the song "Keep Giving Your Love To Me" that would later be performed by Beyoncé for the Bad Boys II soundtrack. The soundtrack was supervised by Sean "Diddy" Combs, who was impressed by Leslie's production style and offered him a management contract upon meeting him.

Under the management of Combs, Leslie worked on various Bad Boy Records projects, including releases from Loon, Cheri Dennis, B5, New Edition and Danity Kane. During that time, Leslie co-produced a record for Britney Spears. Also in 2003, Leslie was introduced by his then attorney Ed Woods to Tommy Mottola. Mottola soon became a mentor of Leslie's and offered him a publishing deal with Aspen Songs and a recording contract with Casablanca, Mottola's imprint distributed by Universal Music Group. Under the mentorship of Mottola and Combs, Leslie signed then-aspiring model Cassie Ventura to his imprint, NextSelection in 2005.

In late 2003, Leslie began recording his debut album, entitled Just Right, and released two singles: "The Way That U Move Girl" and "Used 2 Be" (with Fabolous). The album was never officially released due to creative differences between Leslie and his record label.

2004–2010: Debut album, Transition and leaving label 
Ryan Leslie returned to the studio in 2006 to record a new debut album. The lead single, "Diamond Girl"  was released in December 2007. The video for "Diamond Girl" was premiered on BET's 106 & Park, and released on Leslie's YouTube channel with a special behind-the-scenes clip. In November 2007, he released a video for a song named "I-R-I-N-A" that was produced in-house and released through his YouTube channel as well.

His second single, "Addiction"  features pop singer and protege Cassie, with a rap cameo from long-time collaborator, rapper Fabolous. The song was officially released in August 2008. Of the two music videos made for the song, the "Making of 'Addiction'" clip became Leslie's most popular video on YouTube, with more than 3.2 million views.

His third single, "How It Was Supposed To Be" also has two music videos: a rock version and a military take on the song, which was Leslie's directorial debut and was co-directed by model Tyson Beckford. The single was released March 23, 2009. After many setbacks, his self-titled album, Ryan Leslie, was finally released on February 10, 2009.  Leslie wrote, arranged, produced, and performed every song on his album. Notable instrumentalists on his debut set include Tommy Mottola, Tom "T-Bone" Wolk, and Brent Paschke.

Ryan Leslie enamored old and new fans alike (June 23) during the first of two back-to-back performances at New York City's Bowery Ballroom. The R&B singer/rapper/songwriter/producer/multi-instrumentalist (who parted ways with former label Universal Motown mid-2010) celebrated his new-found independence with performances of former hits like "Addicted" and "How It Was Supposed to Be", as well as two new tracks: "Glory" and "Maybachs and Diamonds".

"Never had a top ten, but they still respect my art," Ryan Leslie sang during "Glory", which is slated to be included on his third release, "Les Is More"—his first independent album following 2009's self-titled debut and "Transition". "Maybachs and Diamonds" is a slow, groovy tune about flourishing his partner with more than just material things, like "Maybachs and Diamonds".

Initially, Leslie had a four-album deal with Universal, but toward the end of that contract, "Universal was interested in reshaping my deal to more of a 360, and they actually made a counter-offer from the initial recording fund," Leslie tells Billboard.com. "At that point I saw that as a window to potentially branch off and try something that was going to be new and dynamic."

While Leslie did not make any formal announcements about his departure from Universal Motown during the set, he took some subtle jabs at his previous label home. "I've always wanted to play these songs but I couldn't before," he said while singing "Guardian Angel." "I always felt like this song should be a single.

2011–present: Les Is More and Black Mozart 
Ryan Leslie announced on Twitter and Facebook in January 2011, that his third album would be released July 4, 2011. His first official single from the album released was 'Glory', despite the first singles performed being 'Beautiful Lie' and 'Breathe'. However Leslie would later announce on his website and Twitter account that the album has now been pushed back for a release 'This Fall'. On October 11, he sent an e-mail to his fanbase saying "I promise 'Les Is More' is just a few weeks away."

Les is More is now a visual album. So far "Glory", "Beautiful Lie", "Good Girl" and "5 Minute Freshen Up" are out on his website. The latter was released on March 20, 2012. "Dress You To Undress You" and "Swiss Francs" are still scheduled for release. Other Tracks Mentioned to be on the album by Leslie via his official Twitter are "Ready or Not" and " Live Good (Riviera Flow) Feat. Raekwon". Leslie has performed the tracks "Breathe (Feat. Mr Hudson) and "One Lonely Heart" live and said they would be included on Les is More. "Joan Of Arc" was released in mid-2011 and Leslie stated at that time that it would be included on Les is More.

Ryan Leslie announced the date for his album Les Is More via Twitter. The album was released on October 22, 2012. Ryan announced in February 2013 that his fourth studio album Black Mozart would be released April 16, 2013, however delayed the release.  The full album was released to members of Leslie's #Renegades club on August 31, 2013.

Other ventures

NextSelection Lifestyle Group 
While working as a producer, Leslie went on to create NextSelection Lifestyle Group, his music-media company he founded with online marketing partner Rasheed Richmond. Ryan signed his first artist, Cassie in 2005. Under Ryan's guidance, Cassie went on to become one of the fastest rising R&B acts that year. Her breakout smash "Me & U" (written and produced by Leslie) spent 20 weeks on the Top 40 and went on to reach number three on the Billboard Hot 100, selling over a million digital units. "Me & U" also went on to become one of the biggest records in the history of Atlantic Records.

Ryan posts an interactive daily video blog, where he gives viewers a taste of what daily life is like in the music business. "Blogging is something that allows us to document life," Leslie said. "When you look at a lot of successful films, books, a lot of them relate to the experiences of others," and the video blog is a way for him to connect with the masses. "There have been other video blogs, but this one's a first of its kind from a music standpoint," he said  "It's a huge commitment," he said of the video blog. "It takes six, seven hours a day to produce a video blog." In anticipation for the release of Les Is More, Leslie releases a new music video from his album for every video that reaches one million hits on his website ryanleslie.com.

Recently, Ryan signed Krys Ivory as his newest act under NextSelection. He also signed YouTube star Mia Rose.

SuperPhone 
In August 2013, Leslie released his fourth studio album, Black Mozart, through his #Renegades music club. The method in which Leslie released Black Mozart galvanized him to start SuperPhone, a direct text marketing service. In subsequent months, musicians such as 50 Cent, Raphael Saadiq, and Talib Kweli would use the underlying technology to launch their respective upcoming studio albums and power their own music membership clubs. Kweli spoke about the experience in an interview, "The first thing that appeals to me is the direct contact with the fans and the fact that I receive their e-mails...The second thing is the fact that the money comes directly to me when you buy the album from me. It goes directly to my account. There is nobody taking their cut."

Leslie's work with SuperPhone has been supported by venture capitalists such as Ben Horowitz, journalists such as TechCrunch's Josh Constine, and musicians such as Kanye West. Miley Cyrus, Zayn, Silk Sonic, Ava Max, and Cardi B have employed SuperPhone direct-texting marketing methods.

Artistry

Musical influences 
Leslie has stated that Stevie Wonder is one of the biggest influences on his music. He attributes Michael Jackson, Prince, Jimi Hendrix, James Brown, Quincy Jones, The Beatles, and D'Angelo as musical heroes as well.

Online presence 
Leslie's blog, YouTube channel, MySpace page and Twitter have been the biggest contributors to his fanbase.  His videos have become some of the most popular on YouTube, bringing accolades such as "Top 10 Most Subscribed Users".  Leslie also posts videos documenting his interaction with his audience, including giving away free iPods, backstage passes to his concerts, and invitations to have dinner with him. His energy and creative spontaneity have earned him the respect from those inside and outside of the music industry. On his website/video diary, there is a clip featuring artists such as Boyz II Men, Chrisette Michelle, Musiq Soulchild, Keri Hilson, Christina Milian, and David Banner praising him for the inspiration they have received from his videos.

Leslie maintains such an active online presence as he believes that it is the future of the music industry. He says that due to the digital music revolution of the past few years, physical compact discs of music will eventually become obsolete, and will become the eight track tape of this generation. Prior to his 2009 MySpace Release concert, Leslie encouraged aspiring musical artists to utilize digital media while marketing themselves.

Personal life 
Producer Ryan Leslie began spotting Cassie Ventura at clubs and parties in late 2004. He was charmed by Cassie's personality and was finally introduced to her by AJ Crimson, Sean "Diddy" Combs' makeup artist, who had worked with Cassie on one of her photo modeling shoots.

Not long afterward, Cassie approached Ryan Leslie to help her record a song that she wanted to give to her mother as a birthday gift. Leslie put together a duet for the two of them to sing, called "Kiss Me". He was so pleased with the result that he played it for record executive Tommy Mottola who quickly offered Cassie a management deal. Leslie soon signed Cassie to his NextSelection label, and wrote and produced Cassie's first single, "Me & U" in 2005.

Leslie was named one of "New York's 50 Hottest Bachelors" in 2009 by PageSix Magazine, published by the New York Post.

Legal issues 
In October 2010, Leslie's laptop was stolen from his Mercedes, while he was on tour in Cologne, Germany. Leslie would offer $20,000, raising it to $1 million reward for the return of it due to his recent productions that it contained. The laptop was returned; however, the intellectual property that Leslie was trying to recover was not present, and Leslie did not feel the reward terms had been met. Armin Augstein, who runs a garage in Pulheim, near Cologne, who returned the laptop was granted the $1 million reward in 2012 after a lawsuit. He was later also made to pay an extra $180,000 in interest for refusing to pay for those two years. Leslie is still in search of the material that was missing. On September 7, 2013, New York City marshals seized Leslie's 2010 Cadillac Escalade, which went up for auction two days later on September 9 due to him continuing to not pay up the reward he offered for the laptop. It was also revealed Leslie had apparently only paid 5,000 dollars so far, even though court documents indicate Leslie's performances make hundreds of thousands of dollars.

Discography 

Just Right (2005)
Ryan Leslie (2009)
Transition (2009)
Les Is More (2012)
Black Mozart (2013)
MZRT (2015)
MZRT Lifetime Album (2018)

Awards and nominations 
BET Awards
2009, Best Male R&B Artist [Nominated]
2009, Best New Artist [Nominated]
Grammy Awards
2011, Best Contemporary R&B Album: Transition (Nominated)
Soul Train Music Awards
2009, Best R&B/Soul or Rap New Artist [Nominated]
Academic Awards
2010, AMBLE Vanguard Award from Harvard University

References

External links 

French Interview for SoulRnB.com
Ryan Leslie on Soulrnb.com French Artist Page
 Rapper ordered to pay the $1M reward he promised for recovery of stolen laptop NEW YORK POST November 29, 2012, article on Ryan Leslie's court case ruling for unpaid finders fee.
 Burned up: Rapper Leslie torches Post front page for covering his attempt to weasel out of a $1M reward NEW YORK POST December 1, 2012, on Leslie's public rap in response to fans about the court ruling made against him for the unpaid recovery reward of his stolen laptop, whereby he challenges the verdict based on that the data was no longer intact.
 
 
 

Living people
1978 births
Singers from Washington, D.C.
Songwriters from Washington, D.C.
Record producers from Washington, D.C.
African-American male rappers
African-American record producers
American male pop singers
American male songwriters
American hip hop singers
American multi-instrumentalists
Harvard College alumni
American contemporary R&B singers
American chief executives
Motown artists
21st-century American rappers
21st-century American male musicians
American people of Barbadian descent
American people of Surinamese descent
Universal Motown Records artists
African-American songwriters
21st-century African-American musicians
20th-century African-American people